Per Asplin (10 August 1928, in Tønsberg – 9 October 1996, in Oslo) was a Norwegian pianist, singer, composer and actor. He co-starred in a handful of films as well as participating in Melodi Grand Prix five times in the 1960s. Still he is probably best remembered as a member of the Norwegian vocal group The Monn Keys and for creating the annual Christmas show Putti Plutti Pott and Santa's Beard.

Discography

External links

Norwegian male film actors
Melodi Grand Prix contestants
1928 births
1996 deaths
Norwegian male composers
Norwegian male stage actors
20th-century Norwegian male actors
20th-century Norwegian male singers
20th-century Norwegian singers
20th-century composers
Musicians from Tønsberg